The Gann Building is a historic building located at 218 S. Market St. in Benton, Arkansas. The building, which was built in 1893, is the only known extant building to have been built out of bauxite. Dr. Dewell Gann Sr., had the building constructed as an office for his medical practice; the building was built by his patients in lieu of payment for medical services. After his office became successful, Gann helped establish the Saline County Medical Society. Gann's son, Dewell Gann Jr., also worked in the office; Gann Jr., was a successful physician as well and was named a Fellow of the Royal College of Surgeons of Edinburgh in 1925. The office was converted to a city library in 1946, and later became a local museum in 1967.

The Gann Building was added to the National Register of Historic Places on October 21, 1975.

See also
National Register of Historic Places listings in Saline County, Arkansas

References

External links
 

Office buildings on the National Register of Historic Places in Arkansas
Museums in Saline County, Arkansas
Commercial buildings completed in 1893
Buildings and structures in Saline County, Arkansas
History museums in Arkansas
National Register of Historic Places in Saline County, Arkansas
Benton, Arkansas